The Con Artists (lit. "The Technicians")  is a 2014 South Korean heist film directed by Kim Hon-sun, and starring Kim Woo-bin, Lee Hyun-woo, and Ko Chang-seok.

Plot
Ji-hyuk is a safe-cracker who lives the high life by stealing antiques and jewelry. He teams up with genius hacker Jong-bae, planner Goo-in and other fellow "technicians" to steal  hidden in the Incheon Customs, and they must do it within 40 minutes.

Cast
 Kim Woo-bin as Ji-hyuk
 Lee Hyun-woo as Jong-bae
 Kim Yeong-cheol as Boss Cho
 Ko Chang-seok as Goo-in
 Jung Man-sik as Prosecutor
 Jo Yoon-hee as Eun-ha
 Lim Ju-hwan as Lee Jo Hwon (Cho's right-hand man)
 Jo Dal-hwan
 Shin Goo as Director Oh
 Kim Ji-an as Skyscraper Guard
 Jung Ji-yoon as Technician assistant
 Ji Seung-hyun
 Heo Ji-won
 Shin Seung-hwan
 Choi Daniel as art gallery owner
 Kim Sung-kyu as Detective team 2 member
 Shin Wonho

Production
Filming in Gwangyang, Incheon and Seoul began in March 2014 and wrapped in August 2014.

It was the first Korean production to film in the city of Abu Dhabi, with locations at the Abu Dhabi International Airport, the Emirates Palace and the Hilton Capital Grand.

Release
The film was released in South Korea on December 24, 2014.

It was also released in North America on January 9, 2015, followed by limited theatrical runs in Taiwan, China, Hong Kong, Singapore, Vietnam and the Philippines.

References

External links
 The Con Artists at Lotte Entertainment
 
 
 

2014 films
2014 action comedy films
2010s crime comedy films
2014 crime action films
2010s heist films
2010s Korean-language films
South Korean crime action films
South Korean crime comedy films
South Korean heist films
Films set in Seoul
Films set in Incheon
Films set in Busan
Films shot in Seoul
Films shot in Incheon
Films shot in Busan
Lotte Entertainment films
2014 comedy films
2010s South Korean films
Films about con artists